Future Schlock is a 1984 Australian film. It was the first of four movies made by the team of Barry Peak and Chris Kiely who ran the Valhalla Cinemas in Sydney and Melbourne. The movie was known in production as The Ultimate Show. The producers claimed they managed to recoup half the amount of money they spent on the film.

References

External links
 
Future Schlock at Ozmovies

1980s science fiction comedy films
Films set in the future
Films set in the 21st century
Australian science fiction comedy films
1984 films
1984 comedy films
1980s English-language films
1980s Australian films